Lützow was a heavy cruiser of Nazi Germany's Kriegsmarine, the fifth and final member of the , but was never completed. The ship was laid down in August 1937 and launched in July 1939, after which the Soviet Union requested to purchase the ship. The Kriegsmarine agreed to the sale in February 1940, and the transfer was completed on 15 April. The vessel was still incomplete when sold to the Soviet Union, with only half of her main battery of eight  guns installed and much of the superstructure missing.

Renamed Petropavlovsk in September 1940, work on the ship was delayed by poor German-Soviet co-operation in crew training and provision of technical literature to enable completion of the ship, which was being carried out in the Leningrad shipyards. Still unfinished when Germany invaded the Soviet Union in June 1941, the ship briefly took part in the defense of Leningrad by providing artillery support to the Soviet defenders. She was heavily damaged by German artillery in September 1941, sunk in April 1942, and raised in September 1942. After repairs were effected, the ship was renamed Tallinn and used in the Soviet counter-offensive that relieved Leningrad in 1944. After the end of the war, the ship was used as a stationary training platform and as a floating barracks before being broken up for scrap sometime between 1953 and 1960.

Design 

The  of heavy cruisers was ordered in the context of German naval rearmament after the Nazi Party came to power in 1933 and repudiated the disarmament clauses of the Treaty of Versailles. In 1935, Germany signed the Anglo–German Naval Agreement with Great Britain, which provided a legal basis for German naval rearmament; the treaty specified that Germany would be able to build five  "treaty cruisers". The Admiral Hippers were nominally within the 10,000-ton limit, though they significantly exceeded the figure.

Lützow was powered by three sets of geared steam turbines, which were supplied with steam by twelve ultra-high pressure oil-fired boilers. As designed, her standard complement consisted of 42 officers and 1,340 enlisted men.

Lützows primary armament was eight  SK L/60 guns mounted in four twin gun turrets, placed in superfiring pairs forward and aft. Her anti-aircraft battery was to have consisted of twelve  L/65 guns, twelve  guns, and eight  guns. The ship also would have carried a pair of triple  torpedo launchers abreast of the rear superstructure. The ship was to have been equipped with three Arado Ar 196 seaplanes and one catapult.

Service history 
Lützow was ordered by the Kriegsmarine from the Deschimag shipyard in Bremen. Lützow was originally designed as a light cruiser version of the Admiral Hipper-class heavy cruisers, armed with twelve  guns instead of the Admiral Hippers eight  guns. The Kriegsmarine decided, however, to complete the ship identically to Admiral Hipper on 14 November 1936. Her keel was laid on 2 August 1937, under construction number 941. The ship was launched on 1 July 1939, but was not completed.

The Kriegsmarine denied the request for Seydlitz and Prinz Eugen, but agreed to sell Lützow, as well as  gun turrets and other weaponry. The price for the heavy cruiser was set at 150 million Reichsmarks, nearly double the original cost of the vessel, which was 83,590,000 Reichsmarks. Complete technical specifications, the results of engine trials, and spare parts were included in the sale. Eighty percent of the material was to be provided within twelve months of the transfer, with the remainder to be provided within fifteen months. Lützow was renamed "L", her original contract name, for the transfer to the Soviet Union.

In February 1940, when the agreement was concluded, Lützow was fitting-out in Bremen. Her main battery guns had been transferred to the German army and placed on railway mountings; they had to be dismantled and returned to Bremen. The ship was then towed to Leningrad on 15 April by a private German towing company. The two navies agreed that Germany would be responsible for naval escort, which included destroyers and smaller vessels. Rear Admiral Otto Feige was placed in command of the operation. Feige then led an advisory commission assigned to assist the Soviet effort to complete the ship.

Soviet service
At the time the ship arrived in Leningrad, only the two forward gun turrets had been installed and the bridge superstructure was incomplete. The only secondary guns installed were the 3.7 cm anti-aircraft guns. The Soviet Navy renamed the ship Petropavlovsk on 25 September 1940, and designated the construction effort to complete the ship Projekt 83. The vessel's design provided the basis for a planned heavy cruiser, designated Projekt 82, although this ship was canceled before work began. Training for the Soviet crew of the ship proved to be contentious; the Soviets wanted their personnel trained in Germany, while the Germans preferred sending instructors to the Soviet Union. Language barriers and inexperience with international training missions also hampered the training effort.

Sea trials for Petropavlovsk were scheduled to begin some time in late 1941, and according to the training program, the Soviet crew would not begin training until a month before the trials. It was decided that Soviet officers would train at German naval schools in the fall of 1941, and that five officers would train aboard Seydlitz when the ship was commissioned for trials. German instructors would also be sent to Leningrad to train engine-room personnel. At the time of the commissioning of Petropavlovsk, the relevant German training and technical manuals would be sent to the Soviet Navy, albeit in German only.

By the time Germany invaded the Soviet Union in June 1941, Petropavlovsk was still incomplete. She was nevertheless used as a floating battery in the defense of Leningrad in August of that year. Several other ships, including the cruiser , joined Petropavlovsk in shelling the advancing Germans. On 7 September, the ship fired on German forces encircling the city; she fired forty salvos from her forward main battery turrets—the only two operational—expending some 700 rounds of ammunition during the attack. On 17 September 1941, the ship was disabled by German heavy artillery; after being hit 53 times, the ship was forced to beach herself to avoid sinking.

On 4 April 1942, the I Fliegerkorps launched a major attack on the Soviet naval forces in Leningrad: 62 Ju 87s, 33 Ju 88s, and 37 He 111s struck the ships in the harbor. Petropavlovsk was hit once (credited by Hans-Ulrich Rudel), suffering serious damage, and sunk. The Soviet Navy raised the ship on 17 September 1942 and towed her to the Neva where she was repaired. Renamed Tallinn in 1943, the ship returned to service to support the Soviet counter-offensive to relieve the Siege of Leningrad in 1944. The ship was never completed, and was used as a stationary training ship after the end of the war. She was later used as a floating barracks in the Neva, and renamed Dniepr in 1953. The date of her disposal is uncertain; Erich Gröner reports the ship survived until being broken up for scrap in 1960, while Conway's All the World's Fighting Ships states that the vessel was scrapped in 1958–1959. Tobias Philbin reports that the ship was broken up in 1953.

Footnotes

Notes

Citations

References

Further reading
 

Admiral Hipper-class cruisers
Ships built in Bremen (state)
1939 ships
World War II cruisers of Germany
Cruisers of the Soviet Navy
World War II cruisers of the Soviet Union
Germany–Soviet Union relations
Proposed ships of Germany
Maritime incidents in September 1941
Cruisers sunk by aircraft
Ships sunk by German aircraft